Chakravarthi Ram-Prasad, FBA is the Distinguished Professor of Comparative Religion and Philosophy at Lancaster University. His research focuses on Indian religions – Hinduism, Buddhism and Jainism – and comparative phenomenology, epistemology, metaphysics and philosophy of religion. His studies include the conceptual roots of contemporary beliefs, politics and conflict in religious context, and the religious identities of South Asian diaspora in the United Kingdom. He was elected as a Fellow of the British Academy in 2017.

Education
Ram-Prasad is an alumnus of Sri Sathya Sai Institute, and earned a masters and a doctorate in philosophy from the University of Oxford.

Career and Work
Ram-Prasad is the Professor of Comparative Religion and Philosophy in the Department of Politics, Philosophy and Religion at the Lancaster University. He was the Associate Dean for Research, Faculty of Arts and Social Sciences (2009–14), and a member of the Academic Advisory Council at the Oxford Centre for Hindu Studies. He has been a regular contributor to the BBC Radio 4's Beyond Belief and Sunday Programme in the United Kingdom.

Ram-Prasad has published eight books and some fifty peer-reviewed articles on Indian religions, comparative religions (Hindu-Christian, Buddhism in India and China), contemporary Indian politics and religion, multiculturalism and British society, and comparative political philosophy. His studies have included religious literature in Sanskrit, Pali and Tamil.

In a review of Ram-Prasad's award-winning book Divine Self, Human Self based on the Bhagavad Gita, the Cambridge University scholar Ankur Barua states, "Ram-Prasad skilfully engages Śaṁkara and Rāmānuja in conversations over classical Vedantic themes of selfhood, being, and agency" to exegetically and hermeneutically explain how these two influential Hindu scholars interpreted the same text to reach two views of Self (Atman) in Hindu philosophy.

Honours
His book "Divine Self, Human Self" was the winner of the Best Book 2011–15, by the Society for Hindu Christian Studies.

In July 2017, Ram-Prasad was elected a Fellow of the British Academy (FBA), the United Kingdom's national academy for the humanities and social sciences.

Selected publications 
Books
Knowledge and Liberation in Classical Indian Thought (Palgrave, 2001), 
Advaita Epistemology and Metaphysics: An outline of Indian non-realism (Routledge, 2002), 
Eastern Philosophy (Weidenfeld and Nicolson, 2005)

, which has been translated into French, Polish and Finnish

Journal articles and chapters

References

External links 
 Lakshmi, BBC Radio 4 In Our Time, link. Chakravarthi Ram-Prasad on the panel with Jessica Frazier and Jacqueline Suthren-Hirst.

Academics of Lancaster University
Year of birth missing (living people)
Living people
Fellows of the British Academy